Himmelfarb or Himelfarb is German and Yiddish for "color of the sky". Notable people with the surname include:

 Alex Himelfarb (born 1947), Canadian civil servant and academic
 Eric Himelfarb (born 1983), Canadian ice hockey player
 Gary Himelfarb (Doctor Dread) (born 1954), a reggae producer 
 George Him (1900–1982), Polish-British designer born Jerzy Himmelfarb
 Gertrude Himmelfarb (1922–2019), American historian 
 Milton Himmelfarb (1918–2006), American sociographer

See also
Himmelfarb Health Sciences Library, George Washington University

Jewish surnames

de:Himmelfarb